Wenvoe Tunnel is a disused tunnel on the defunct Barry Railway that runs under Culverhouse Cross in the Vale of Glamorgan in south Wales, on the western outskirts of Cardiff. It was opened in 1889 on a line used to carry coal to Barry Docks. The line also had a sparse passenger service and closed after March 1963.

Description
The southern end of the tunnel is to the west of The Alps Quarry, off Caerau Lane, and the northern end is north of Culverhouse Cross Retail Park, just west of the A4232 road and south east of the hamlet of Drope.
The tunnel passed under the A48 Cardiff–Cowbridge road and A4050 Cardiff–Barry road via Wenvoe and it carried the Barry Railway for 1867 yards through the downs before it crossed the River Ely on the Drope viaduct of 178 yards and St.Fagans viaduct of 180 yards over the South Wales main line and continued north to the coal fields but at just under half-mile north of its northern portal, a single line branch to Peterston-super-Ely ran to the west to connect with the former GWR South Wales main line. Further still, at 1.35 miles from the northern portal, Tynycaeau Junction was the location of the divergence of the Cadoxton-Pontypridd line with the Penrhos Branch which ran to Caerphilly and the Rhymney valley. Classed as a freight-only branch, over the years, it passed many day passenger excursions to Barry Island from the Rhymney Valley and rail network beyond Rhymney. Opened in August 1901, the 6-mile branch incorporated the 490-yard curved, Walnut Tree tunnel (now breached by quarry workings) and the magnificent 517-yard Walnut Tree viaduct bridging the Taff Gorge south of Taffs Well. By 1905, the Penrhos branch had been extended from Penrhos Junction (South) west of Caerphilly, to join the Brecon & Merthyr Railway at Llanbradach, again incorporating two engineering feats, the first of which was the 385-yard Penyrheol viaduct, south-west of Caerphilly and finally their impressive Llanbradach (or Pwll-y-Pant) viaduct, the length of which is subject to conjecture but an Institution of Civil Engineers Minutes of Proceedings document dated 11 February 1908, confirmed the length as 800 yards. All three of these impressive viaducts were of steel spans supported on brick piers. Due to duplication of rail routes, following the 1922 GWR Grouping, the extension to the Brecon & Merthyr Railway was taken out of use on 4 August 1926 and the latter two viaducts had been demolished by 1937. Walnut Tree viaduct survived in use until December 1967 and was demolished in 1969.

It is brick-lined apart from a short section at the south end. It has an air shaft near the centre of its length, almost as wide as the tunnel. Its original air shaft chimney of circular red brick with Staffordshire blue corbelling, was removed following closure and a breeze-block structure built to the rear of a concrete-aproned area of a retail outlet and which at ground level, occupies an airway of only a quarter of the circular air shaft area below ground. As at 2020, a large bore concrete water main maintained by Welsh Water is run at tunnel ground level and against the east side of the bore. Since falling out of use following 1963, the tunnel, has suffered much flooding.

Construction

The Barry Docks and Barry Railway Company were founded to break the effective monopoly that the Taff Vale Railway and the Cardiff Docks had established over export of coal from the South Wales Coalfield.
Work on the railway began in 1885, and within four years included an  line from Trehafod to the Barry Docks, with several branch lines.

In July 1885, The Engineer reported that the heavy work at Wenvoe Tunnel was being pressed forward, and it was expected that there would soon be 3,000 men at work on the project.
The earth was removed from the tunnel using skips that held  and ran on three  roads, mostly pulled by ponies.
The skips were run out to the tip, where they could be lifted by hand when off the road.
Several pressurized oil lights were used to allow night work.
In the deep cutting to the north they were connected to a pump that was used to clear water from the tunnel.
In the rock cutting to the south they were connected to air compressors used to drive rock drills.

History

The double-track tunnel was opened for service in 1889.
It was closed following the destruction by fire on week ending 31 March 1963, of Tynycaeau Junction signal box.
The stone above the north portal with the date of 1888 is now covered in moss and scarcely legible.
The top of the ventilation shaft is enclosed in a concrete building in a retail parking lot in Culverhouse Cross.
The tunnel contains a large water main.

Notes

Sources

Barry Railway
Railway tunnels in Wales
Buildings and structures in the Vale of Glamorgan
1889 establishments  in Wales
History of the Vale of Glamorgan